The Heckler and Koch HK43 is a civilian semi-automatic rifle based upon the Heckler & Koch HK33 rifle and is the predecessor of the Heckler & Koch HK93 semi-automatic rifle.

Overview
The HK43 was created in 1974 as a semi-automatic version of the HK33 (which itself was a scaled down version of the Heckler & Koch G3, but chambered for 5.56×45mm NATO). According to H&K's numbering nomenclature, the "4" indicates that the weapon is a paramilitary rifle, and the "3" indicates that the caliber is 5.56 mm. The HK40-series was designed for sale to conscripts so they could be familiar with their service rifle before entering military service, a common practice in Germany and Switzerland. They had a bayonet mount and furniture just like the military model, but came with a semi-auto trigger pack instead of a full auto trigger pack. This allowed a civilian rifle to be easily made into an assault rifle just by dropping in a full auto trigger pack.

HK43 can sell for anywhere between $5,500 and $9,000 depending on the condition and the economy at the time.

An HK43 version KA1 with a shorter 322 mm barrel was used in 1977 by the German RAF urban guerrilla group to assassinate general attorney Siegfried Buback and two policemen. Verena Becker, a former RAF member, claimed Stefan Wisniewski was the killer.

HK93
The HK93 is a variant based upon the HK43 that was imported to the United States. The name change was reportedly based on several factors including the changes in barrel length to comply with US import laws and changes in H&K's own nomenclature system. Approximately 18,000 HK43/HK93 rifles were imported to America prior to the 1989 import ban. The standard HK93A2 utilized a fixed stock while the HK93A3 used a retractable stock. The HK93 series had a redesigned semi-automatic trigger pack and metal shelf installed in the trigger group well that made it impossible for it to fit a full-auto trigger pack. It also had the bayonet mount removed and had different furniture.

C93
The C93 is a civilian version of the HK93 created by Century International Arms, Inc. It comes with an  barrel with a 1:9 twist ratio. A carrying handle and 40-round magazine are standard. The C-93 is built from Thai Type-11 parts kits using an American made barrel and other miscellaneous American parts.

References

External links
 Buddy Hinton Collection / HK
 Semi-automatic rifles banned from importation in 1989
 HK 93 Instruction Manual

5.56×45mm NATO semi-automatic rifles
Roller-delayed blowback firearms
Heckler & Koch rifles
Weapons and ammunition introduced in 1974